Murle MacKenzie Lindstrom Breer (born January 20, 1939) is an American professional golfer best known for winning the 1962 U.S. Women's Open. She competed as Murle MacKenzie until her first marriage in 1961, then as Murle Lindstrom until her second marriage in 1969.

Breer was born in St. Petersburg, Florida. She joined the LPGA Tour in 1958. Her first Tour victory came in a major championship in 1962, when she defeated Jo Ann Prentice and Ruth Jessen by one stroke in the U.S. Women's Open which was held at the Dunes Golf Club in Myrtle Beach, South Carolina. Breer enjoyed three more Tour victories in the 1960s and one mixed team win in the 1970s. She retired as a touring professional in 1984.

For more than two decades, Breer has run a golf school at High Hampton Inn Country Club in western North Carolina. She and husband, Robert, an aeronautical engineer, have two daughters, Tracy and Vicki.

Professional wins

LPGA Tour wins (4)

Other wins
1979 JCPenney Mixed Team Classic (with Dave Eichelberger)

Major championships

Wins (1)

References

External links

American female golfers
LPGA Tour golfers
Winners of LPGA major golf championships
Golfers from Florida
Golfers from North Carolina
Sportspeople from St. Petersburg, Florida
1939 births
Living people
21st-century American women